Doom 94 is a semi-biographical novel by Latvian writer Jānis Joņevs about the generation living in Jelgava, Latvia in the 1990s that searches for their own identity and are fans of alternative culture. This is his debut novel. Since 2016, this book has been translated into 11 languages and a movie was released in September 2019.

Plot 
The novel begins on April 5, 1994, the death of Kurt Cobain, the lead singer and guitarist of Nirvana. Cobain's death influences youngsters living in Jelgava, Latvia to begin listening to heavy metal music. This is also the time that Latvia has recently regained its independence from the Soviet Union, causing economic and social upheaval. The book's main character Janis turns to the alternative lifestyle offered by an emergent heavy metal scene.

Translations 
Since 2016 the original book ‘’Jelgava 94’’ has already been translated into 11 languages – French, Slovenian, Norwegian, Estonian, Hungarian, Lithuanian, English, Bulgarian, Spanish, German and Finnish.

Awards

2014 

European Union Prize for Literature
 Annual Latvian Literature Award in category "Best Debut’’
 Latvian National Television award "Kilograms kultūras"
 Latvian National Library Children and Young Adults Jury award, 15+ category
 Bookshop's "Jānis Roze" most sold book of 2014

2015 

 AKKA/LAA "Author award of 2015"

Film 
Work on a film adaptation of the book called "Jelgava 94" began in 2017. The film was released in September 2019. Movie scenes were filmed in many locations throughout Riga and Jelgava, and at a former school in Priekuļi Municipality. The main actor was Bruno Bitenieks who was a student at Riga Teika Secondary School. The film received funding from the National Film Center and is supported by Jelgava Municipality. The film was produced by Jura Podnieka studija.

References 

2013 debut novels
Latvian novels
Books about rock music
2013 novels